People detained by the International Criminal Court (ICC) are held in the ICC's detention centre, which is located within a Dutch prison in Scheveningen, The Hague.  The ICC was established in 2002 as a permanent tribunal to prosecute individuals for genocide, crimes against humanity, war crimes, and the crime of aggression.  As of June 2018, it has issued public arrest warrants for 42 individuals, six of whom are currently in custody of the court. 

The ICC detention centre is for holding people who have been charged with crimes, not for imprisoning convicted criminals.  As such, all detainees are considered innocent until their guilt has been proven.  Upon conviction by the ICC, criminals are transferred outside the Netherlands to serve their sentences.

Detention centre
The ICC currently has twelve detention cells in a Dutch prison in Scheveningen, The Hague.  Suspects held by the International Residual Mechanism for Criminal Tribunals are held in the same prison and share some facilities, like the fitness room, but have no contact with suspects held by the ICC.

The ICC registrar is responsible for managing the detention centre.  The rules governing detainment are contained in Chapter 6 of the Regulations of the Court and Chapter 5 of the Regulations of the Registry.  The International Committee of the Red Cross (ICRC) has unrestricted access to the detention centre.

Facilities
Each individual has his own toilet and washing area.  Each has access to a small gym and is offered training with a physical education instructor.

Detainees are provided with meals, but they may also cook for themselves, purchase food from the prison shop, and have ingredients ordered in.  However, Charles Taylor's lawyers have complained that "the food which is served is completely eurocentric and not palatable to the African palate".

Each detainee has a personal computer in his cell, on which he can view material related to his case.  They are offered computer training, if required, and language courses.

Detainees' rights
Detainees are allowed to communicate in private with their defense teams and diplomatic representatives of their countries of origin.  They are permitted visits from family members, spouses and partners, and spiritual advisors.

List of detainees
The following table lists all the people who have been held at the ICC detention centre since it was established in 2006. The first person ever detained by the court was Thomas Lubanga, who arrived at the detention centre on March 17, 2006.

Three former prisoners have been released or transferred, including Charles Taylor, who was tried in the Special Court for Sierra Leone. His trial was held at the ICC's facilities in The Hague because of political and security concerns about holding the trial in Freetown.

See also
List of people indicted by the International Criminal Court

References

 
The Hague
Lists of people by legal status